Stureplan is a public square in central Stockholm, between Norrmalm and Östermalm. The square connects the major streets Kungsgatan, Birger Jarlsgatan and Sturegatan. The buildings around the square house offices of banks and other financial institutions, as well as several corporate headquarters.

Some of the country's most famous and expensive restaurants and bars are located in the area around Stureplan. Some examples are Sturehof, Spy Bar, Riche, Laroy, Hell's Kitchen, East and Sturecompagniet. Shops in the area include Versace, Hugo Boss, Gucci, and LV.

In Sweden, Stureplan has also become a well-known symbol for exclusivity since the major refurbishments during the 1980s. Known as an area with many expensive, luxurious bars and restaurants, it is considered a playground for upper-class youth, celebrities, young business executives and some of the Swedish Royal Family. All the while, among average Stockholmers it is typically thought of as a swanky and elitist place.

Close to Stureplan is the park Humlegården with the National Library of Sweden. Stureplan is connected to Östermalmstorg metro station of the Stockholm Metro.

References

Squares in Stockholm